Suzzan Blac (born Birmingham, UK, 1960) is an English surreal painter whose work depicts physical, mental and sexual abuse based on personal experience.

Profile

Artwork
In 2009, Blac exhibited at Resistance Gallery in London, a show entitled "A Basement of Dolls". The exhibition focused on pornography and the body images of girls and women. Her art has also been shown in Berlin.

Her visual art was included in Metamorphosis 2: 50 Contemporary Surreal, Fantastic and Visionary Artists by Jon Beinart, Meg Woodsworth, and Hilary Simmons. 

Blac's work is being used in social worker training, and to help abuse-victims in group therapy.

Writing
An autobiography entitled  The Rebirth of Suzzan Blac (Bettie Youngs Books, 2012) tells of the writer's troubled childhood of poverty and sexual abuse and the her use of her artwork to heal herself.

Blac contributed "My canvas, my pain, my healing" to Prostitution Narratives: Stories of Survival in the Sex Trade by Melinda Tankard Reist and Caroline Norma.

References

External links
 Official website

21st-century English painters
English women painters 
English autobiographers
Women outsider artists 
Living people
English bloggers
1960 births
Anti-pornography feminists
Artists from Birmingham, West Midlands